"In Another Land" is a song by the Rolling Stones, released in December 1967 as the first single from the album Their Satanic Majesties Request, and credited solely to Bill Wyman. In America, London Records released it as a single a week before the album.

Written by bassist Bill Wyman, "In Another Land" is the only Rolling Stones song to feature Wyman on lead vocals, and one of only three Rolling Stones songs he wrote (the others being "Downtown Suzie" and the unreleased "Goodbye Girl").  The single was released on 2 December 1967, credited to Bill Wyman, with the Stones' "The Lantern" as the B-side.  It peaked at number 87 on the Billboard Hot 100 singles chart and at number 62 on the Cash Box Top 100 singles chart, on which it was credited to Bill Wyman.

Background
The song was recorded on a night when Wyman had shown up at the studio and found that the session had been cancelled. Feeling frustrated that he had potentially wasted time in driving there, engineer Glyn Johns asked him if he had anything that he'd like to record. "I'd been messing with this song. It was a bit... what I thought was kind of spacy, you know... a bit kind of Satanic Majesties-like. And psychedelic in a way."

Lyrically, Wyman stated that "The idea for the song is about this guy who wakes up from a dream and finds himself in another dream." The song describes events that transpire in a dreamlike state:

Johns showed the song to Mick Jagger, Keith Richards, and Brian Jones, who all liked it and decided to include it on the record.

The musicians on the song are Wyman on lead vocals, with both Ronnie Lane and Steve Marriott of the Small Faces on guitar and backing vocals, Nicky Hopkins on keyboards, Charlie Watts on drums, and Jagger adding backing vocals.

At the conclusion of the track as heard on the album, Wyman himself can be heard snoring. He was unaware this had been tagged onto his song until he first played the completed album. He learned later that one night when he had fallen asleep in the studio, Jagger and Richards miked him up and recorded him snoring, and stuck it onto his track as a joke. This does not appear on the single.

Reception
Billboard described the single as an "off-beat piece of rock ballad material that
should prove a monster" and as "a weirdy that can't miss."  Cash Box said that the song enters the "electrical-kaleidoscopic realm" and incorporates "vocal reverb, use of thudding rhythmics and a good melody."

Personnel

The Rolling Stones
Bill Wyman – lead vocals, bass, piano, Hammond organ
Mick Jagger – backing vocals
Keith Richards – acoustic guitar, backing vocals
Brian Jones – Mellotron, sound effects
Charlie Watts – drums

Additional musicians
Nicky Hopkins – harpsichord
Ronnie Lane – backing vocals
Steve Marriott – backing vocals

Citations

References

1967 songs
1967 debut singles
1960s ballads
Bill Wyman songs
The Rolling Stones songs
London Records singles
Songs written by Bill Wyman
Rock ballads